Heiner Zieschang (12 November 1936 in Kiel – 5 April 2004 in Bochum) was a German mathematician. He was a professor at Ruhr University in Bochum from 1968 till 2002. He was a topologist. In 1996 he was an honorary doctor of University of Toulouse and in 1997 he was an honorary professor of Moscow State University.

Literature 
 Heiner Zieschang: Flächen und ebene diskontinuierliche Gruppen. Berlin 1970,  
 Heiner Zieschang: On decompositions of discontinuous groups of the plane. Math. Zeit. 151 (1976), 165-188
 Heiner Zieschang; Elmar Vogt; Hans-Dieter Coldewey: Surfaces and planar discontinuous groups, Berlin 1980 
 Heiner Zieschang: Finite groups of mapping classes of surfaces. Berlin 1981, 
 Gerhard Burde; Heiner Zieschang: Knots, Berlin [u.a.] 1985 ; 
 Ralph Stöcker; Heiner Zischang: Algebraische Topologie. Teubner, Stuttgart 1988,  
 Heiner Zieschang: Lineare Algebra und Geometrie. Stuttgart 1997,  
 Boto v. Querenburg: Mengentheoretische Topologie. 3. Auflage. Springer, Berlin 2001,

References

External links
 Ruhr-Universität trauert um Prof. Heiner Zieschang 
 Heiner Zieschang – his life and work
 Zieschang Gedenkschrift, G&T Monograph dedicated to Heiner Zieschang

1936 births
2004 deaths
20th-century German mathematicians
21st-century German mathematicians
Scientists from Kiel
Topologists